Germolles-sur-Grosne (literally Germolles on Grosne) is a commune in the Saône-et-Loire department in the region of Bourgogne-Franche-Comté in eastern France. It lies on both sides of the Grosne River.

See also
Communes of the Saône-et-Loire department

References

Communes of Saône-et-Loire